Al Iraqiya (al-ʿIrāqiyyä) is a satellite and terrestrial public broadcaster and television network in Iraq that was set up after the fall of Saddam Hussein. It is an Arabic language network that serves upwards of 85% of Iraq's population, and is viewed by a significant percentage (about 40%).

The channel began under the name IMN as part of the Iraqi Media Network (or Shabeket al-Elam Iraqi in Arabic) project undertaken. The Science Applications International Corporation (SAIC) was the contractor for this Defense Department project. 

Included in the programming is the very aggressive Political Actuality program "Burning Issues" that tackles the very sensitive subject of terrorism in Iraq, hosting both the victims and the arrested/convicted perpetrators.

Harris Corporation took over the project from SAIC and completed—on time and in budget—two TV channels, a national newspaper, and radio stations.

On May 31, 2006, Ali Jaafar, a sports anchorman for Iraqi state television, was gunned down in Baghdad.

See also

Television in Iraq

External links

References

Television stations in Iraq
Arab mass media
Arabic-language television stations
International broadcasters
Television channels and stations established in 2003
2003 establishments in Iraq